Johanna Joseph (born January 21, 1992 in Enghien-les-Bains) is a French basketball player who plays for club Flammes Carolo Basket Ardennes of the Ligue Féminine de Basketball the top league of basketball of women in France.

References

French women's basketball players
1992 births
Living people
21st-century French women